Ana Rodríguez or Ana Rodriguez may refer to:

 Ana Rodríguez (singer) (born 1974), Cuban singer
 Ana Rodríguez (footballer) (born 2002), Panamanian footballer
 Ana Rodriguez (Miss Texas USA) (born 1986), American beauty pageant winner
 Ana Rodriguez (Manitoba politician), politician from Manitoba
 Ana Rodriguez (scientist) (PhD 1993), parasitologist
 Ana María Rodríguez (writer) (born 1958), American children's author
 Ana María Rodríguez (alpine skier) (born 1962), Spanish former alpine skier